Harry Lipscomb (April 2, 1878 – September 7, 1926) was a United States Navy sailor and a recipient of the United States military's highest decoration, the Medal of Honor.

Biography
On that day, while the North Dakota was conducting tests using oil as fuel, an explosion occurred, killing three sailors and endangering the ship. In the engine room, pieces of hot coal and coke floated in waist-high hot water, oil was aflame above one of the boilers, and the entire room was filled with smoke, steam, and fumes. Despite these dangers, Lipscomb and five other men of the ship's engineering department entered the engine room to haul the boiler fires and perform other tasks necessary to prevent a boiler explosion. After ensuring the safety of the ship, they then searched for and removed the bodies of the three sailors killed in the initial explosion.

For these actions, Lipscomb and the five other men were awarded the Medal of Honor a month later, on October 4. The others were Chief Machinist's Mate Thomas Stanton, Chief Machinist's Mate Karl Westa, Chief Watertender August Holtz, Chief Watertender Patrick Reid, and Machinist's Mate First Class Charles C. Roberts.

Lipscomb reached the rank of chief watertender before leaving the Navy. He died at age 48 and was buried at Arlington National Cemetery, in Arlington, Virginia.

Medal of Honor citation
Lipscomb's official Medal of Honor citation reads:
On board the U.S.S. North Dakota, for extraordinary heroism in the line of his profession during the fire on board that vessel, 8 September 1910.

See also

 List of Medal of Honor recipients in non-combat incidents

References

External links
 

1878 births
1926 deaths
People from Washington, D.C.
United States Navy sailors
United States Navy Medal of Honor recipients
Burials at Arlington National Cemetery
Non-combat recipients of the Medal of Honor